Thors may refer to the following:

Thors, a 2015 comic series featuring multiple versions of Thor (Marvel Comics)
Thors, Aube, a French commune in the department of Aube
Thors, Charente-Maritime, a French commune in the department of Charente-Maritime
Thorsborg, Minnesota, a United States ghost town in the state of Minnesota